The 2004 UAW-DaimlerChrysler 400 was a NASCAR Nextel Cup Series race held on March 7, 2004, at Las Vegas Motor Speedway in Las Vegas, Nevada. Contested at 267 laps on the  speedway, it was the 3rd race of the 2004 NASCAR Nextel Cup Series season. Matt Kenseth of Roush Racing won the race.

This marks the debut of Kyle Busch in the Cup Series.

Entry list
 (W) denotes past winner of the race (in some iteration, has been run since 1998).
 (R) denotes rookie driver.
 (i) denotes driver who are ineligible for series driver points.

Larry Gunselman failed to qualify while John Andretti, Larry Foyt, and Andy Hillenburg all withdrew.

Qualifying 
1. Kasey Kahne *#9 Dodge Dealers/UAW Dodge Evernham Motorsports 174.904 mph

2. Kurt Busch #97 IRWIN Industrial Tools Ford Roush Racing 174.548 mph

3. Brian Vickers * #25 GMAC Financial Services Chevrolet Hendrick Motorsports 174.537 mph

4. Jamie McMurray #42 Texaco Havoline Dodge Chip Ganassi Racing 174.436 mph

5. Ryan Newman #12 ALLTEL Dodge Penske Racing 174.340 mph

6. Jeremy Mayfield #19 Dodge Dealers/UAW Dodge Evernham Motorsports 174.267 mph

7. Bobby Labonte #18 Interstate Batteries Chevrolet Joe Gibbs Racing 173.863 mph

8. Brendan Gaughan * #77 Kodak Easyshare Dodge Penske/Jasper Racing 173.824 mph

9. Greg Biffle #16 National Guard Ford Roush Racing 173.807 mph

10. Bill Elliott #91 UAW-National Training Center Dodge Evernham Motorsports 173.768 mph

11. Elliott Sadler #38 M&M's Ford Robert Yates Racing 173.740 mph

12. Jimmie Johnson #48 Lowe's Chevrolet Hendrick Motorsports 173.444 mph

13. Casey Mears #41 Target DodgeChip Ganassi Racing 173.405 mph

14. Michael Waltrip #15 NAPA Auto Parts Chevrolet Dale Earnhardt Incorporated 173.266 mph

15. Scott Riggs * #10 Valvoline Chevrolet MBV Motorsports 173.066 mph

16. Kevin Harvick #29 GM Goodwrench Chevrolet Richard Childress Racing 173.010 mph

17. Ricky Craven #32 Tide Chevrolet PPI Motorsports 172.983 mph

18. Kyle Busch #84 CARQUEST Chevrolet Hendrick Motorsports 172.955 mph

19. Tony Stewart #20 Home Depot Chevrolet Joe Gibbs Racing 172.728 mph

20. Jeff Gordon #24 Dupont Chevrolet Hendrick Motorsports 172.469 mph

21. Rusty Wallace #2 Miller Lite Dodge Penske Racing 172.403 mph

22. Robby Gordon #31 Cingular Wireless Chevrolet Richard Childress Racing 172.150 mph

23. Sterling Marlin #40 Coors Light Dodge Chip Ganassi Racing 171.996 mph

24. Jeff Green #43 Lucky Charms Dodge Petty Enterprises 171.750 mph

25. Matt Kenseth #17 DeWalt Power Tools Ford Roush Racing 171.679 mph

26. Dale Earnhardt Jr. #8 Budweiser Chevrolet Dale Earnhardt Incorporated 171.516 mph

27. Mark Martin # 6 Viagra Ford Roush Racing 171.505 mph

28. Jeff Burton #99 Pennzoil Ford Roush Racing 171.483 mph

29. Dale Jarrett #88 UPS Ford Robert Yates Racing 171.423 mph

30. Johnny Sauter * # 30 AOL/IMAX NASCAR 3D Chevrolet Richard Childress Racing 171.358 mph

31. Ken Schrader #49 Schwan's Home Service Dodge BAM Racing 171.352 mph

32. Kyle Petty #45 Georgia Pacific/Brawny Dodge Petty Enterprises 171.146 mph

33. Ricky Rudd #21 Motorcraft Ford Wood Brothers Racing 171.130 mph

34. Ward Burton # 0 Netzero HiSpeed Chevrolet Haas CNC Racing 170.783 mph

35. Kevin Lepage #4 YokeTV.com Chevrolet Morgan-McClure Racing 170.444 mph

36. Johnny Benson #09 Miccosukee Gaming & Resorts Dodge Phoenix Racing 170.401 mph

37. Terry Labonte #5 Kellogg's ChevroletHendrick Motorsports 170.304 mph

38. Joe Nemechek #01 USG Sheetrock Chevrolet MB2 Motorsports 169.977 mph

39. Scott Wimmer * #22 Caterpillar Dodge Bill Davis Racing 169.673 mph (provisional)

40. Carl Long #02 RacingJUNK.com Pontiac SCORE Motorsports 163.701 mph (provisional)

41. Derrike Cope #50 redneckjunk.com Dodge Derrike Cope 169.311 mph (provisional)

42. Morgan Shephard #89 Voyles/Carter's Royal Disposall Ford Cindy Shephard 164.986 mph (provisional)

43. Kirk Shelmerdine #72 Freddie B's/Tucson Ford Kirk Shelmerdine 163.320 mph (provisional)

Did not qualify

44. Larry Gunselman #98 Lucas Oil Products Ford William Chris Edwards 161.103 mph

Summary
The UAW-DaimlerChrysler 400 was run on Sunday, March 7, 2004, over 267 laps at the Las Vegas Motor Speedway in Las Vegas, Nevada.

Four drivers were sent to the rear of the field due to engine changes: Ward Burton, Kevin Lepage, Jeff Gordon, and Derrike Cope.

Rookie Kasey Kahne started on the pole, though Kurt Busch, who started second, took the lead shortly after and held it for the race's first four laps. Kahne took the lead back on lap 5 and held it under green for thirty-one laps. On lap 36, the lead was taken by Jimmie Johnson, who held it for five laps before the race's first caution came on lap 40 for oil on the track. Scott Riggs led one lap under caution, though Kahne led the pack back to the restart. Tony Stewart took the lead from Kahne on lap 54; he held this lead for thirty-five laps under green. On lap 88, an accident in turn four involving Ryan Newman brought out the race's second caution. The race restarted on lap 93, with Stewart holding the lead for the first two laps under green and Matt Kenseth overtaking him to lead lap 95. Kenseth remained in first place for forty-four laps until the third caution of the race, brought about by a crash, in turn, two by Jeff Green's #43 car. The race restarted on lap 143 and remained under green for another twenty-three laps, all of which were led by Kenseth. The fourth caution, which happened on lap 166, was caused by a crash in turn four involving Michael Waltrip's #15 car. Tony Stewart retook the lead under caution, but the restart (lap 173) was led by Kenseth, who led the next twelve laps under green. The fifth caution of the race was brought out due to another instance of oil on the track; the yellow flag was displayed on lap 184. Jeff Burton led one lap under caution, and Kevin Harvick led the field to the restart on lap 193. He led until the race's sixth and final caution due to debris. Harvick maintained the lead for the restart on lap 207 and held it for another twenty-seven lap laps before losing it under green to Kenseth. The #17 car remained the race leader for the last thirty-eight laps, all under green, to win the UAW-DaimlerChrysler 400 for the second year in a row.

Race results
The top ten finishers are listed below.

Race Statistics
 Time of race: 3:06:35
 Average Speed: 
 Pole Speed: 
 Cautions: 6 for 37 laps
 Margin of Victory: 3.426 sec
 Lead changes: 18
 Percent of race run under caution: 13.9%         
 Average green flag run: 32.9 laps

References

2004 UAW-DaimlerChrysler 400
2004 UAW-DaimlerChrysler 400
NASCAR races at Las Vegas Motor Speedway